Vasudhara Falls is a waterfall situated near Badrinath, in Uttarakhand, India.

Geography 
Uttarakhand is surrounded by waterfalls. Vasudhara waterfall is set in the background of a 145 m cliff. Nearby mountains are Chaukhamba, Nilkantha and Balakun. 

The falls flow into the river Alaknanda, flowing towards Badrinath Temple. The distance from Badrinath to Vasudhara is 9 km.

Satopanth glacier sits near the bottom of Vasudhara. Satopanth Tal is 25 km from Badrinath. Laxmi van (forest) is on the way to Satopanth glacier from Vasudhara.

History 

'Vasu' refers to Lord Vishnu's Vasudeva. Dhara (river in Sanskrit) means "path of the river", so "the path of Lord Vishnu".

In Hinduism, the legend says that lewania is a 2 person soul. It is also the place where Sage Vedavyasa divided the Vedas into four Rig, Yajur, Sama and Atharva.

The water of this spring does not touch the body of sinners. For this reason, Hindus take the water of this spring with them. Sinners should stay away. It is said that if the holy water of this spring starts falling on you, then you are a virtuous soul. The one on whom it falls is considered to be entitled to salvation and because of this, devotees stand under this holy waterfall. This spring is considered to have a flavor like nectar because its water has been enriched by Ayurvedic herbs, such that the person on which its water falls becomes healthy. Hindus keep holy water at their homes to use in religious practices.

The Pandavas passed through Ehi on their way to Swargarohini Yatra. Sahadeva gave up his life near Vasudhara. They reached two hills, but could not cross them. Mahabali Bhima was the most powerful among them, so he picked up a boulder and threw it between the two hills, making an enormous bridge, allowing them to continue towards heaven. From Tawi the bridge is called Bhempul.

Asthavasu was described in the Puranas, one of whom meditated there. He received Shri Krishna as his son. He became Nand Baba in Dvapara Yuga, Vasudhara is Nand Baba's favorite meditation place.

Access 
Mana Village and Vasudhara Fall are usually accessible to tourists from the second week of May to October or November when Badrinath temple is open to the general public. Badrinath is accessible by motor vehicles from Rishikesh, the nearest railway station.

Trekking 

The three-hour trek starts from Mana village. After passing Saraswati Mandir, the trek becomes very steep, allowing views of Vasudhara river valley. 

The route is stony with some grass and shrubs in the sides. Even on a bright sunny day, the weather is mildly cool and breezy (during June to August). Sometime misty and fog may appear. A light jacket is advised for late evening hours.

References 

Waterfalls of Uttarakhand
Geography of Chamoli district